Ischyropalpus is a genus of antlike flower beetles in the family Anthicidae. There are about 15 described species in Ischyropalpus.

Species
These 15 species belong to the genus Ischyropalpus:

 Ischyropalpus bipartitus (Casey, 1895)
 Ischyropalpus cochisei Werner, 1973
 Ischyropalpus dispar Werner, 1973
 Ischyropalpus gemellus Werner, 1973
 Ischyropalpus lividus (Casey, 1895)
 Ischyropalpus nitidulus (LeConte, 1852)
 Ischyropalpus obscurus (LaFerté-Sénectère, 1849)
 Ischyropalpus occidentalis (Champion, 1890)
 Ischyropalpus ornatellus (Casey, 1895)
 Ischyropalpus pinalicus (Casey, 1895)
 Ischyropalpus placidus Werner, 1973
 Ischyropalpus sturmi (LaFerté-Sénectère, 1849)
 Ischyropalpus subtilissimus (Pic, 1896)
 Ischyropalpus turgidicollis (Casey, 1895)
 Ischyropalpus vividus (Casey, 1895)

References

Further reading

 
 

Anthicidae
Articles created by Qbugbot